Jujubinus vexationis is a species of sea snail, a marine gastropod mollusk in the family Trochidae, the top snails.

Description
The size of the shell varies between 5 mm and 8 mm.

Distribution
This species occurs in the Atlantic Ocean off Madeira.

References

 Curini-Galletti M. (1990). Revision of the genus Jujubinus Monterosato, 1884: The J. gravinae (Dautzenberg, 1881) species group. Lavori, Società Italiana di Malacologia 23: 37–50 pl. 1–4-page(s): 43–45; pl. 2 fig. 5-8

External links
 

vexationis
Gastropods described in 1990
Molluscs of Madeira